{{DISPLAYTITLE:NZR WB class}}

The NZR WB class was a class of tank locomotives that operated in New Zealand.  Built in 1898 by the Baldwin Locomotive Works, the twelve members of the class entered service during the first five months of 1899.  Eight were withdrawn by the end of 1935, while four others survived with new boilers until the mid-1950s.

History

In the late 1890s, New Zealand's national network was expanding at a great rate and demand for services on existing lines was rising.  However, the size of the locomotive fleet was inadequate to handle the demand - this was at least in part due to the economic difficulties created by the Long Depression.  The New Zealand Railways Department (NZR) had built the WA class in its own workshops, but desperate for more engines, went shopping overseas for more.  High prices and workers' strikes in England meant that the Baldwin Locomotive Works of Pennsylvania was contacted in 1898 to provide twelve locomotives built to similar specifications as the WA class.  Delivery was swift and the locomotives entered service between January and May 1899.  Although initially classified as WA, they were re-classified WB in 1900–01 to avoid any confusion with the earlier locomotives constructed in New Zealand.

Operation

Most were initially based at Wanganui's East Town depot, but two each went to Wellington and Westport and one to Whangarei.  By World War I, they were equally distributed between Westport and Whangarei.

In their early years, WB locomotives ran all kinds of trains from their main base in Wanganui - the prestigious New Plymouth Mail passenger express, goods trains to Napier and through the Wairarapa, and local mixed trains of passengers and freight from Wanganui to Hāwera and Palmerston North.  Within a few years, more powerful locomotives displaced the WB class from many of these services and they were sent to join their classmates in Westport and Whangarei.

On the isolated Westport section, the dominant traffic was coal from the various inland mines served by rail, and the WBs worked these services for a number of decades until they were displaced in the 1950s by the WW class.  During their years of operation, the WB class was seen as ideal for operations on the lines that fanned out from Westport, and four were overhauled and given new boilers in the mid-1920s to prolong their lives.

Withdrawal

The first withdrawals of WB class locomotives occurred in the late 1920s, when Whangarei-based WB 301 was retired in March 1928.  By the end of 1932, all six WBs that had been based in Whangarei were withdrawn - they were 290, 293, 295, 296, 297, and 301.  In Westport, the two that did not receive new boilers were withdrawn around the same time: WB 291 ceased operations in December 1931 and was followed by WB 294 in May 1935.  Until the Westport section was linked to the national network in 1943, the remaining four had secure roles; although members of the superior WW class had been introduced to Westport in 1929–30, they did not arrive in sufficient quantities to seriously displace the WBs until the opening of the Stillwater - Westport Line.  During the 1940s, the extent of the operations of the WBs decreased markedly, and by 1955, they were little more than shunters in Westport's yard.  In the second half of 1955, WB 298 and WB 300 were withdrawn, and during the next year, the final two, 292 and 299, were removed from service, though they were not officially withdrawn until January 1957.  WB 300 was towed to Dunedin to be scrapped, but this was not an economical procedure and the other three were dumped in two Westland rivers to stabilise river banks and halt erosion.  WB 298 was dismantled in Westport and its boiler was dumped at the "locomotive graveyard" in Omoto, near Greymouth, while in 1958, WB 292 was taken to Seddonville and toppled into Coal Creek.  Eventually, it was joined by WB 299 on 1 January 1960.

Preservation

Inspired by the recovery of locomotives from riverbeds such as K 88 from the Ōreti River in Southland, the Baldwin Steam Trust was established to recover WB 292 and WB 299 from their resting place near Seddonville.  The Seddonville Branch between Seddonville and Mokihinui Mine had closed in 1974, and by the late 1980s, nature had grown over the old formation and there were no roads within a mile of where the two locomotives lay.  Nonetheless, a plan was formulated and in mid-1989, the engines were successfully recovered.  The Baldwin Steam Trust ultimately plans to restore both locomotives back to full operational condition. 292 & 299 are at the Rimutaka Incline Railway Heritage Trust's Maymorn depot being restored.

 WB 292 Baldwin No. 16172 of 1898
 WB 299 Baldwin No. 16175 of 1898

See also
 NZR W class
 NZR WA class
 NZR WD class
 NZR WE class
 NZR WF class
 NZR WG class
 NZR WW class
 NZR WS / WAB class
 Locomotives of New Zealand

References

Citation

Bibliography

External links
The Baldwin Steam Trust
NZR Baldwin Locomotives

Wb class
2-6-2T locomotives
Baldwin locomotives
Railway locomotives introduced in 1898
3 ft 6 in gauge locomotives of New Zealand